Plop-Știubei is a village in Căușeni District, Moldova.

References

Villages of Căușeni District